V.R. Eaton High School is a public high school in far northern Fort Worth, Texas, with a Haslet mailing address. It is a part of the Northwest Independent School District (NISD).

Eaton, NISD's third comprehensive high school, was opened in August 2015 with grades 9–10. In 2018, they were 5A State Champions in baseball.

The school coffeeshop is named Java City. On a daily basis, as of 2017, about 900 students take orders from the coffeeshop.

References

External links
 
 

Public high schools in Tarrant County, Texas
Northwest Independent School District high schools
Public high schools in Fort Worth, Texas